
Year 348 BC was a year of the pre-Julian Roman calendar. At the time it was known as the Year of the Consulship of Corvus and Laenas (or, less frequently, year 406 Ab urbe condita). The denomination 348 BC for this year has been used since the early medieval period, when the Anno Domini calendar era became the prevalent method in Europe for naming years.

Events 
 By place 

 Persian Empire 
 After being besieged by the Persian forces of King Artaxerxes III, Sidon is taken and its population is punished with great cruelty.

 Greece 
 The Athenian help to its cities in Macedonia is diverted by a revolt in Euboea which Philip II of Macedon has fomented. He conquers the city of Olynthus in the Chalcidice and he annexes Chalcidice to Macedonia.
 The city of Eretria on the island of Euboea successfully rebels against the rule of Athens and Euboea is declared independent. The Athenian statesman and general, Phocion's tactical skills save an Athenian force sent to fight the supporters of Philip II on Euboea.

 Roman Republic 
 Rome and Carthage make a trade agreement under which Carthage will not attack those Latin states which are faithful to Rome. This agreement demonstrates that Rome is now the dominant power in the Latin League.

Births

Deaths 
 Plato, Greek philosopher and author

References